This is a list of prominent Sicilian mobsters by city.

Agrigento province

Campobello di Licata
Giuseppe Falsone (born 1970)

Cattolica Eraclea
Nicolo Rizzuto (1924–2010)
Vito Rizzuto (1946–2013)
Gerlando Sciascia (1934–1999)

Porto Empedocle
Luigi Putrone (born 1960)
Gerlandino Messina (born 1972)

Racalmuto
Maurizio Di Gati (born 1966)

Raffadali
Salvatore Cuffaro (born 1958)

Sciacca
Salvatore Di Gangi

Siculiana
Alfonso Caruana (born 1946)
Nicola Gentile (1885–1976)

Caltanissetta province

Gela
Daniele Emmanuello (1963–2007)
Antonio Rinzivillo

Mussomeli
Giuseppe Genco Russo (1893–1976)

Riesi

Giuseppe Di Cristina (1923–1978)

San Cataldo
Leonardo Messina (born 1955)

Villalba
Calogero Vizzini (1887–1954)

Catania province

Catania
Antonio Calderone (1935–2013)
Giuseppe Calderone (1925–1978)
Salvatore Cristaldi
Umberto Di Fazio
Eugenio Galea
Santino La Causa
Giuseppe Pulvirenti
Benedetto Santapaola (born 1938)

Palermo province

Altofonte
Francesco Di Carlo (born 1941)
Santino Di Matteo (born 1954)
Gioacchino La Barbera (born 1959)
Domenico Raccuglia (born 1964)

Belmonte Mezzagno
Benedetto Spera (born 1934)

Bisacquino
Vito Cascio Ferro (1862–1943)

Caccamo
Antonino Giuffrè (born 1945)

Capaci

Casteldaccia
Giuseppe Panno

Ciaculli
Giuseppe Greco "Piddu u tinenti"
Michele Greco (1924–2008)
Pino Greco (1952–1985)
Salvatore "Ciaschiteddu" Greco (1923–1978)
Salvatore "The Engineer" Greco (1924–?)
Giuseppe Lucchese (born 1958)
Mario Prestifilippo (1958–1987)
Vincenzo Puccio (1945–1989)
Lorenzo Tinnirello

Cinisi
Gaetano Badalamenti (1923–2004)
Cesare Manzella (1897–1963)

Corleone
Bernardino Verro (1866–1915)
Giuseppe Morello (1867–1930)
Calogero Bagarella (1935–1969)
Leoluca Bagarella (born 1942)
Luciano Leggio (1925–1993)
Michele Navarra (1905–1958)
Bernardo Provenzano (1933–2016)
Salvatore Riina (born 1930–2017)

Misilmeri
Salvatore Sciarabba

Monreale
Giuseppe Balsano (1945–2005)

Montelepre
Salvatore Lombardo

Palermo

Acquasanta
Michele Cavataio (1929–1969)

Arenella
Gaetano Fidanzati (1935–2013)

Brancaccio
Giuseppe Graviano (born 1963)
Filippo Graviano
Antonino Vernengo
Cosimo Vernengo
Pietro Vernengo

Carini
Andrea Adamo
Angela Congigliaro
Don Agostino Coppola
Ferdinando "Freddy" Gallina 
Franca Pellerito
Angelo Antonino Pipitone
Benedetto Pipitone
Epifania Pipitone
Francesco Marco Pipitone
Gaspare Pulizzi

Corso Dei Mille
Filippo Marchese (1938–1983)
Giuseppe Marchese (born 1963)
Francesco Tagliavia
Pietro Tagliavia (born 1978)

Noce
Calcedonio Di Pisa (1931–1962)
Raffaele Ganci (born 1932)

Pagliarelli
Antonio Rotolo (born 1946)
Giovanni Motisi (born 1959)
Ignazio Motisi
Lorenzo Motisi
Matteo Motisi (1918–2003)
Gianni Nicchi (born 1981)
Settimo Mineo (born 1938)

Central Palermo
Angelo La Barbera (1924–1975)
Salvatore La Barbera (1922–1963)

Partanna-Mondello
Gaspare Mutolo  (born 1940)
Rosario Riccobono (1929–1982)

Passo di Rigano-Boccadifalco  
Salvatore Buscemi
Carlo Gambino (1902–1976)
Salvatore Inzerillo (1944–1981)
Michelangelo La Barbera

Porta Nuova
Gerlando Alberti (born 1927)
Vincenzo Buccafusca
Tommaso Buscetta (1928–2000)
Giuseppe Calò (born 1931)
Salvatore Cancemi (1942-2011)
Salvatore Cucuzza
Nicola Ingarao (1961–2007)
Vittorio Mangano (1940–2000)

Resuttana
Giuseppe Bono
Francesco Madonia (1924–2007)
Antonio Matranga

Roccella
Giuseppe Guttadauro (born 1948)

San Lorenzo
Giuseppe Giacomo Gambino (1941–1996)
Filippo Giacalone
Pino Guastella
Francesco Madonia (1924–2007)
Mariano Tullio Troia (1933–2010)

Santa Maria di Gesù
Pietro Aglieri (born 1959)
Francesco Paolo Bontade (1914–1974)
Stefano Bontade (1939–1981)
Salvatore Contorno (born 1946)
Carlo Greco
Francesco Marino Mannoia (born 1951)

Tommaso Natale
Salvatore Lo Piccolo (born 1942)
Sandro Lo Piccolo

Uditore
Pietro Torretta (1912–1975)

Villagrazia di Palermo
Benedetto Capizzi (born 1944)
Gaetano Lo Presti
Francesco Sorci

Partinico
Giovanni Bonomo
Nenè Geraci (1917–2007)
Vito Vitale (born c. 1959)
Leonardo Vitale

San Giuseppe Jato
Gregorio Agrigento
Bernardo Brusca
Giovanni Brusca (born 1957)
Baldassare Di Maggio (born 1954)
Salvatore Genovese
Antonio Salamone (1918–1998)

San Mauro Castelverde
Giuseppe Farinella (born 1925)

Trabia
Salvatore Rinella

Villabate
Antonio Cottone (1904/05–1956)
Giuseppe Montalto
Salvatore Montalto
Joseph Profaci

Trapani province

Alcamo
Vincenzo Milazzo
Fillipo Rimi (born 1923)
Vincenzo Rimi (1902–1975)

Castellammare del Golfo

Joseph Bonanno (1905–2002)

Castelvetrano
Francesco Messina Denaro
Matteo Messina Denaro (born 1962)

Mazara del Vallo
Mariano Agate (born 1939)
Andrea Manciaracina (born 1962)

Salemi
Salvatore Miceli (born 1946)
Antonio Salvo (1929–86)
Ignazio Salvo (1932–1992)

Trapani

Vincenzo Virga

References

 
Organized crime-related lists